Argegno is a comune (municipality) in the Province of Como in the Italian region Lombardy, located about  north of Milan and about  north of Como.

The village, like many in the Lake Como area is popular with expatriates, particularly from the United Kingdom, a situation exacerbated by the economic flux in recent years. The local economy is heavily dependent upon tourism and the service industry.

A cable car can transport people up to the nearby village of Pigra.

Argegno is situated on an inlet in the lake, and is built alongside the River Telo which flows into the lake, the discharge of which is heavily dependent upon the season.

Argegno borders the following municipalities: Brienno, Colonno, Dizzasco, Lezzeno, Nesso, Pigra, Schignano. It is situated between the villages of Menaggio and Cernobbio.

History of Argegno

Argegno is of Roman origin, and is named after the Roman consul Publio Cesio Archigene. With the fall of Rome and the subsequent geopolitical instability in Italy a series of fortifications were constructed in the medieval period, including the arched bridge which still stands. The largest structure in the village is the Sanctuary of Sant'Anna, which was constructed in the seventeenth century, and contains stucco work from later time.

Argegno is the home and studio village of watercolour artist Paul Wright. He is also the author of the Italian Trilogy series of books. The first book 'An Italian Home’ Settling by Lake Como published in 2011 . The sequel is 'An Italian Village.' A Perspective of Life Beside Lake Como  and the third book is ‘Cats Do Eat Spaghetti’ Living with our Rescue Cats

Demographic evolution

References

Cities and towns in Lombardy
Articles which contain graphical timelines